Michèle Brigitte Dombard (born 17 January 1956) is a Belgian alpine skier. She competed in two events at the 1984 Winter Olympics.

References

1956 births
Living people
Belgian female alpine skiers
Olympic alpine skiers of Belgium
Alpine skiers at the 1984 Winter Olympics
Sportspeople from Brussels